Morgan Wong wing fat (born in 1984) is a Hong Kong-based artist. He was based in Beijing and London and currently lives and works in Hong Kong.

Morgan Wong has had solo shows such as Filing Down a Steel Bar Until a Needle is Made, Tintype Gallery, London, UK (2013); A Story of an Eel Chef, Oyoyo Art Center, Sapporo, Japan (2010); Once You Were Here, Para Site Central, Hong Kong (2009). He had several teaching experiences. He was a guest lecturer of School of Creative Media at City University of Hong Kong in 2011 and part-time lecturer at Hong Kong Baptist University in 2014.

Exhibitions

Solo exhibitions
 2015 – "One Hour" Morgan Wong's Solo Exhibition, Art Basel, Hong Kong 
 2014–2015 – Opening Exhibition of Shanghai 21st Century Minsheng Art Museum
 2013 – "Filing Down a Steel Bar Until a Needle is Made", Tintype Gallery, London, UK
 2011– "One Hour", 2P Contemporary Art Gallery, Hong Kong,"Untitled – Agnosia Series I", Videotage, Hong Kong
 2010 – "A Story of an Eel Chef", Oyoyo Art Center, Sapporo, Japan
 2009 – "Once You Were Here", Para/site Art Space Central, Hong Kong

Group exhibitions
 2015 Untitled – Expressway, Art Basel,  
 2014 After Time, Pearl Lam Galleries, Hong Kong, China
 Art Basel Hong Kong, Pearl Lam Galleries, Hong Kong, China
 Hong Kong ArtWalk 2014, Multiple Galleries, Hong Kong Contested Spaces,
 Indian Art Fair, New Deli, Hindu, 2013 18th Videobrasil, SESC Pompeia, St Paulo, Brazil
 Artists Film International, White Chapel Art Gallery, London, UK
 Move on Asia – Video Art in Asia 2002 to 2012, ZKM, Karlsruhe, Germany
 Habits, Cleavages and Fractures, UCL Geology Collections, London, UK, 2012 Gelassenheit: Letting It Be, 2P Contemporary Art Gallery, Hong Kong, China
 Hong Kong Diary, 25 Bilder/Sekunde, Mannheim, Germany
 Running on the Sidelines, Soka Art Center, Taipei, Taiwan
 MA & Other Post Graduates 2012, Atkinson Gallery, Millfield, UK,2011 China New Design, Milan Triennale Design Museum, Milan; Turin Palace Museum (Palazzo Chiablese), Turin, Italy
 Arts Centre Open House 2011, Hong Kong Arts Centre, Hong Kong, China
 Recycling Love, Blue Room, Hong Kong, China
 Move On Asia in Europe, CASA Asia, Barcelona and Madrid, Spain
 The Knife's Edge, Fremantle Art Centre, Perth, Australia
 Societe Generale Chinese Art Awards Tour Exhibition, Shanghai Library, Shanghai, China; Huashan
 1914, Taipei, Taiwan; Artistree, Hong Kong, China; One Raffles Quay, Singapore

Awards
 Shortlisted in The Sovereign Asian Art Prize in 2012, Hong Kong Art Biennale in 2010
 2010 Shortlisted in Hong Kong Art Biennale
 2009 Shortlisted in Hong Kong Contemporary Art Biennale Award
 Winner of the 2008 Silver Award for Single Screen-based Interactive Media Category at the Hong Kong Independent Film & Video Awards

Publications

Books
 Hong Kong Eye: Hong Kong Contemporary Art, 2012, Skira Editore, pp. 310 – 313
 Hong Kong Artists: 20 Portraits, 2012, Verlag für moderne Kunst, pp. 194 – 201

Exhibition catalogues
 Move on Asia 2004 – 2013, Alt Space Loop, pp. 308–309
 Fictional Recoveries 2012, Pearl Lam Galleries, pp. 12–15

Newspapers/magazines/websites
 South China Morning Post, "West Kowloon arts hub sees end to design contests", by Vivienne Chow, 23 May 2013
 South China Morning Post, "Four Hongkongers in running for Sovereign Asian Art Prize", by Vivienne Chow, 31 January 2013
 South China Morning Post, "Getting into the Frame", by Vivienne Chow, A4 Focus, 8 July 2012
 The Guardian,"Top 10 art galleries in Hong Kong", by Mary Agnew, 4 July 2012
 Timeout Hong Kong, "Gelassenheit: Letting It Be", by Piper Koh, 11 April 2012
 Pipeline, "An Hour of Experience Fitted into Hong Kong Trickiest Shaped Gallery" by David Boyce, pp. 49 – 50, Oct 2011
 Ming Pao Weekly, "Lost in Space-Time", by Kwan Yee Chan, p. 96, Issue 2238, Oct 2011
 Timeout Hong Kong, "Inner Visions", by Fiona Ng, p. 57, Issue 82, Jun 2011
 Yishu Journal of Contemporary Chinese Art, "Four Discussions with Hong Kong Artists: Leung Chi Wo, Lam Tung Pang, Morgan Wong, Lee Kit" by Stephanie Bailey, pp. 80 – 83, Volume 10 Number 3, May/ Jun 2011
 Hong Kong Gallery Guide, "Revealing Links in Time", by Cristina Sanchez Kozyreva, pp. 74–75, Issue 19, May 2011
 The West Australian, "Video Art Comes of Age", by Donal Fitzpatrick, p. 7, 25 March 2011

References

1984 births
Living people
Hong Kong artists